Sergio Reyes Jr. (born October 28, 1969) is an American boxer. He competed in the men's bantamweight event at the 1992 Summer Olympics.

References

1969 births
Living people
American male boxers
Olympic boxers of the United States
Boxers at the 1992 Summer Olympics
Sportspeople from Fort Worth, Texas
Bantamweight boxers